Knut Herbert "Murren" Karlsson (8 September 1896 – 21 October 1952), better known as Herbert Carlsson, was a Swedish football inside forward born in Gothenburg. He played professionally in both Sweden and the United States. He also earned twenty caps, scoring nineteen goals, with the Swedish national team.

Club career
After starting his career playing for three local clubs, he joined IFK Göteborg in 1917 and won a Swedish Championship with the club the year after. He became the club's first big star. He emigrated to United States in 1922 where he played in for the New York Vikings in the New York State League.  In 1924, he signed with Indiana Flooring in the American Soccer League.  In 1927, he joined the Vikings on a tour of Scandinavia.  When he returned to the United States, he found that his team had been sold to Charles Stoneham and renamed the New York Nationals.  In 1930, Stoneham renamed the team the New York Giants.  Carlsson left the Giants and the ASL following the 1931 fall season.  He returned to Sweden in 1936 where he stayed until he died in 1952.

International career
Carlsson earned twenty caps, scoring nineteen goals, for Sweden. In 1920, he played for the Swedish soccer team at the 1920 Summer Olympics.  He led the team in scoring with nine goals.

Career statistics

Club

References

External links
Profile at Swedish Olympic Committee

1896 births
1952 deaths
American Soccer League (1921–1933) players
IFK Göteborg players
Indiana Flooring players
New York Giants (soccer, 1930–1932) players
New York Nationals (ASL) players
Swedish footballers
Olympic footballers of Sweden
Footballers at the 1920 Summer Olympics
Expatriate soccer players in the United States
Association football inside forwards
Footballers from Gothenburg